After the destruction of Punic Carthage in 146 BC, a new city of the same name (Latin Carthāgō) was built on the same land by the Romans in the mid-1st century BC. By the 3rd century, Carthage had developed into one of the largest cities of the Roman Empire, with a population of several hundred thousand. It was the center of the Roman province of Africa, which was a major breadbasket of the empire. Carthage briefly became the capital of an usurper, Domitius Alexander, in 308–311.
Conquered by the Vandals in 439, Carthage served as the capital of the Vandal Kingdom for a century. 
Re-conquered by the Eastern Roman Empire in 533–534, it continued to serve as an Eastern Roman regional center, as the seat of the praetorian prefecture of Africa (after 590 the Exarchate of Africa). The city was sacked and destroyed by Umayyad Arab forces after the Battle of Carthage in 698 to prevent it from being reconquered by the Byzantine Empire. A fortress on the site was garrisoned by Muslim forces until the Hafsid period, when it was captured by Crusaders during the Eighth Crusade. After the withdrawal of the Crusaders, the Hafsids decided to destroy the fortress to prevent any future use by a hostile power. Roman Carthage was used as a source of building materials for Kairouan and Tunis in the 8th century.

Foundation

By 120–130 BC, Gaius Gracchus founded a short-lived colony, called Colonia Iunonia, after the Latin name for the Punic goddess Tanit, Iuno Caelestis. The purpose was to obtain arable lands for impoverished farmers. The Senate abolished the colony some time later to undermine Gracchus' power.

After this ill-fated attempt, a new city of Carthage was built on the same land by Julius Caesar in the period from 49 to 44 BC, and by the first century, it had grown to be the fourth largest city of the empire, with a population in excess of 100,000 people.
It was the center of the province of Africa, which was a major breadbasket of the Empire. Among its major monuments was an amphitheater, built in the 1st century, with a capacity of   30,000 seats.

Early Christianity

Carthage also became a center of early Christianity. Tertullian rhetorically addressed the Roman governor with the fact that the Christians of Carthage that just yesterday were few in number, now "have filled every place among you—cities, islands, fortresses, towns, market-places, the very camp, tribes, companies, palaces, senate, forum; we have left nothing to you but the temples of your gods." (Apologeticus written at Carthage, c. 197).

Tertullian later broke with the mainstream that was represented more and more by the bishop of Rome, but a more serious rift among Christians was the Donatist controversy, which Augustine of Hippo spent much time and parchment arguing against. In 397 the Biblical canon for the western Church was confirmed at Carthage.

The Christians of Carthage conducted persecutions against the pagans, during which the pagan temples, sanctuaries and holy sites, notably the famous Temple of Juno Caelesti, were destroyed.

Vandal period
The Vandals under their king Gaiseric crossed to Africa in 429, either as a request of Bonifacius, a Roman general and the governor of the Diocese of Africa, or as migrants in search of safety. They subsequently fought against the Roman forces there and by 435 had defeated the Roman forces in Africa and established the Vandal Kingdom. 
As an Arian, Gaiseric was considered a heretic by the Catholic Christians, but a promise of religious toleration might have caused the city's population to accept him.

The Vandals during their conquest are said to have destroyed parts of Carthage by Victor Vitensis in Historia Persecutionis Africanae Provincia including various buildings and churches.

Byzantine period

After two failed attempts by Majorian and Basiliscus to recapture the city in the 5th century, the Eastern Roman Empire finally subdued the Vandals in the Vandalic War of 533–534. Using the deposition of Gaiseric's grandson Hilderic by his cousin Gelimer as a casus belli, the Romans dispatched an army to conquer the Vandal kingdom. On Sunday, October 15, 533, the Roman general Belisarius, accompanied by his wife Antonina, made his formal entry into Carthage, sparing it a sack and a massacre.

Thereafter, the city became the seat of the praetorian prefecture of Africa, which later became the Exarchate of Africa during the reign of the emperor Maurice.  Along with the Exarchate of Ravenna, these two regions were the western bulwarks of the Roman Empire, all that remained of its power in the west. In the early seventh century, Heraclius the Elder, the Exarch of Africa, rebelled against the usurper Phocas, and his son in turn became the emperor Heraclius.

Islamic conquest
The Exarchate of Africa first faced Muslim expansion from Egypt in 647, but without lasting effect.  A more protracted campaign lasted from 670 to 683. Captured by the Muslims in 695, it was recaptured by the Byzantines in 697, but was finally conquered in 698 by the Umayyad forces of Hassan ibn al-Nu'man.

Fearing that the Eastern Roman Empire might reconquer it, the Umayyads decided to destroy Roman Carthage in a scorched earth policy and establish their center of government further inland at Tunis. The city walls were torn down, the water supply cut off, the agricultural land ravaged and its harbors made unusable.

The destruction of the Roman Carthage and the Exarchate of Africa marked a permanent end to Roman rule in the region, which had largely been in place since the 2nd century BC.

It is visible from archaeological evidence that the town of Carthage continued to be occupied, particularly the neighborhood of Bjordi Djedid. The Baths of Antoninus continued to function in the Arab period and the historian Al-Bakri stated that they were still in good condition. They also had production centers nearby. It is difficult to determine whether the continued habitation of some other buildings belonged to Late Byzantine or Early Arab period. The Bir Ftouha church might have continued to remain in use though it is not clear when it became uninhabited. Constantine the African was born in Carthage.

The fortress of Carthage continued to be used by the Muslims until the Hafsid era and was captured in 1270 by Christian forces during the Eighth Crusade. After the withdrawal of the Crusaders, Muhammad I al-Mustansir decided to completely destroy it to prevent a repetition.

References

 
Auguste Audollent, Carthage Romaine, 146 avant Jésus-Christ — 698 après Jésus-Christ, Paris (1901).
Ernest Babelon, Carthage, Paris (1896).

See also
History of Carthage
Carthage (archaeological site)
Baths of Antoninus
Carthage National Museum
Carthage Paleo-Christian Museum
Bardo National Museum

Carthage
Roman towns and cities in Tunisia
Populated places of the Byzantine Empire
Carthage
Carthage
Carthage
Carthage
7th-century disestablishments in the Exarchate of Africa
7th-century disestablishments in Africa
Destroyed cities
Carthage